Betsson AB is a Swedish company that offers a number of online gambling products, such as casino, poker, bingo, sports betting and scratch cards through more than 20 online gaming brands including Betsson, Betsafe and NordicBet. Betsson AB is listed on the Nasdaq Stockholm Large Cap List.

Corporate history
Betsson AB can trace its roots back to 1963, and the foundation of AB Restaurang Rouletter by Bill Lindwall and Rolf Lundström, later renamed Cherryföretagen AB (Cherry), which provided slot machines to restaurants in Sweden. Cherry acquired a minority share of Net Entertainment in 1998, which was a company co-founded with Investment AB Kinnevik, tasked with developing online gaming solutions. The rest of the shares in Net Entertainment held by Kinnevik was acquired by Cherry in 2000, making Kinnevik the largest shareholder of Cherry in the process. In 2003, after the return of Pontus Lindwall (son of Bill Lindwall), as the CEO of Cherry, the company buys into Betsson (founded by Henrik Bergquist, Anders Holmgren and Fredrik Sidfalk), which had a gaming licence in England at that time, and later acquires a license in Malta. In 2006, Cherryföretagen changes its name to Betsson and the traditional gaming operation in the business sector of Cherry merges into a new group, Cherryföretagen, which later shortens the name back to Cherry and launches its own online sector based in Malta.  Ulrik Bengtsson stepped up as CEO of Betsson in March 2016, and took over after Pontus Lindwall, who has stayed on as chairman of the board. Ulrik Bengtsson stepped down as CEO on 09.04.2017 and was succeeded by Pontus Lindwall. As a consequence, Patric Svensk was appointed Chairman of the Board after Pontus.

In May 2021, Betsson obtaining two licences from the Hellenic Gaming Commission for their brand.

In May 2021, Betsson partnered with Norwegian Toppserien women's football club Avaldsnes IL.

In 2021, it was announced that Betsson will be launching in Mexico through a partnership with local company Big Bola Casinos. In 2021, Betsson agreed a deal to become a regional sponsor of the 2021 Copa América. As part of the deal, Betsson will acquire branding rights.

In 2021, Betsson expanded its operations in Eastern Europe with the launch of new brand Europebet and a new office in Minsk, Belarus. Under the brand Europobet - Betsson will offer casino, sportsbook and poker services.

In 2021, Betsson announced CEO Pontus Lindwall is to step down. The company is on the lookout for a new CEO after Lindwall accomplished the task of getting the betting company back on track. Lindwall stays on as CEO until a new CEO is hired.

In February 2022, Betsson debuts online betting in Buenos Aires city and province (Argentina) with local operator Casino Victoria.

In July 2022, Pontus Lindwall reported that organic growth is a perfect strategy for Betsson. Between April and June, group’s organic traffic from Latin America, Central and Eastern Europe and Central Asia increased the growth by 13%. Total revenue from the region reached €45.7m in Q2 which increased by 86.2% compared to the previous year.

Products
Betsson AB's subsidiaries owns and operates a number of websites via its subsidiaries in Malta.

In November 2017, Betsson signed a deal with Scout gaming to integrate its daily fantasy sports platform across all its brands, including BetSafe, its UK facing online bookmaker. The integration is expected to be completed by 2018.

Mobile Apps

BetSafe released the free mobile app for App Store on May, 26 in 2016. Since then it has 25 updates.

Later in 2016, Betsafe has added Poker and Virtual Sports to their app. In new updates they have also added new games, recently played widget, personalized casino lobby and have included a navigation tab bar.

As for Android, Betsafe provides an app developed by BML Group ltd, compatible with wide range of Android devices including Samsung, Xiaomi, Motorola, Huawei, Vivo, LG, Sony, and HTC.

Business acquisitions 
In 2011 the company acquired all of the shares in the Betsafe Group for SEK 292 M. The aim of the acquisition was to increase Betsson's market presence and enable continued growth. The acquisition grew Betsson's number of customers to approximately 419,000 — surpassing Unibet in the number of active players. That same year Betsson signed an agreement with a Chinese state-owned company regarding the development of joint-owned gaming operations.

In March 2017, Betsson completed its £26 million acquisition of NetPlay TV's assets, adding Jackpot247, SuperCasino and Vernons to its European gaming multi-brand portfolio.

In February 2020, Betsson acquired Gaming Innovation Group B2C assets.

In August 2021, Betsson acquired Inkabet. Betsson subsidiary SW Nordic Limited brokered the $25 million deal. As part of the deal Betsson agreed to a $4 million performance incentive if Inkabet outperform EBIT targets.

In August 2021, Betsson acquired 28% of Canadian start-up Slapshot Media Inc, for a purchase price of $2.4 million.

Awards 
Betsson received the Best Customer Service Award at the prestigious 10th Annual eGaming Review (EGR) in London. Betsson is ahead of 800 participants. For the fourth consecutive year, the Bettson Group has been the customer service winner of the year.

Betsson won three awards at the 2021 SBC Awards: Casino Operator of the Year, Racing Sportsbook of the Year and Social Responsible Sportsbook of the Year.

Data Breach
In January 2020 Jackpot247 sent emails to all of their customers advising them that they had suffered a data breach with the following message:

"We regret to inform you that Jackpot247 has suffered a security incident and some of your personal data has been revealed to an unauthorized person. We took various mitigating measures and the unauthorised person is no longer able to access your data. Rest assured that our investigations show that your credit card, payment information, password and copies of any documents sent to Jackpot247 have not been accessed and remain secure. After conducting detailed investigations into the incident, we can confirm that the unauthorised person has been able to access your username and name, email address, telephone number, residential address, date of registration and some internal activity classifications that are not of relevance to the unauthorized person.It is our duty to report this data breach to you and inform you what data has been compromised.Users were advised to reset passwords and be wary of phishing emails being received."''

References

External links

Betsson AB Corporate information

Online gambling companies of Malta
Online poker companies
Gambling companies established in 2000
Internet properties established in 2000
Online gambling companies of Sweden
Companies based in Stockholm
Companies listed on Nasdaq Stockholm
2000 establishments in Sweden